Jørlunde Church is a late Viking age/early medieval church situated in Jørlunde, Denmark. The church was built by Skjalm Hvide around the year 1085.

Church frescos 
The church is richly decorated inside with frescos dating back to the middle of the 12th century created by the so-called Jørlunde workshop.

Pipe organ 

The pipe organ was built by Frobenius in 2009 and has 19 voices, 24 stops, 25 ranks and 1360 pipes, amongst them the tallest organ pipes installed in a Danish village church. The organ's architects are Inger and Johannes Exner. The specifications and tonal design are created by the composer Frederik Magle. The album Like a Flame was recorded on the organ.

Specifications 

Tracker key action and couplers, Electrical stop action.

References

External links 

 Jørlunde church homepage (in Danish)

Churches completed in 1085
Churches in the Diocese of Helsingør
Church frescos in Denmark
Viking buildings and structures
Buildings and structures in Frederikssund Municipality
Churches in the Capital Region of Denmark
Lutheran churches converted from Roman Catholicism